Giovanni Battista Spinola (1681–1752) was a Roman Catholic Cardinal. He was the nephew of Giambattista Spínola (iuniore).

Early in his life he served as the governor in Benevento in 1711 and the governor in Rimini in 1717–1719.  He also served in many other administrative positions in the Papal States.  He was ordained a Catholic Priest in 1728, and made a Cardinal in 1733, given the titulus of San Cesareo in Palatio.

References

Sources
The Cardinals of the Holy Roman Church

1681 births
1752 deaths
Spinola family
Cardinal-nephews